The women's freestyle 63 kilograms is a competition featured at the 2012 World Wrestling Championships, and was held at the Millennium Place in Strathcona County, Alberta, Canada on 29 September 2012.

Results
Legend
F — Won by fall

Final

Top half

Bottom half

Repechage

References
Results Book – Page 21

Women's freestyle 63 kg
World